Pete Rock & CL Smooth were a hip hop duo from Mount Vernon, New York. They made their debut with their 1991 EP, All Souled Out and followed that with their 1992 LP Mecca and the Soul Brother.

Career

1991–1994: The Golden Age
As a producer, DJ Pete Rock (Peter Phillips) gained notoriety for his use of obscure soul and jazz records, frequently making use of horn-driven hooks. Lead vocalist CL Smooth (Corey Penn) delivered more conscious style of rap which contrasted with the popular gangsta rap records of the time, and he mostly avoided profanity, similar in style and delivery to positive East Coast rappers like those associated with the Native Tongues Crew. Their signature hit was "They Reminisce Over You (T.R.O.Y.)", a requiem for fallen friends — namely Troy "Trouble T-Roy" Dixon, a member of Heavy D & The Boyz, who died in 1990. They were first signed to Elektra Records, managed, and executive produced by Eddie F of Heavy D and The Boyz and Untouchables Entertainment who also then managed Pete Rock as a producer. Pete Rock was one of the original three "Untouchables" producers along with Eddie F himself and Nevelle Hodge.

In 1994 the duo followed up with The Main Ingredient, and they appeared as frequent guest artists collaborating on remixes, soundtracks, and other works. Public Enemy, EPMD, Heavy D and Johnny Gill were among the artists they collaborated with, and they can also claim credit for producing (and performing on) Run–D.M.C.'s 1993 comeback single "Down with the King".

1995–2009: Creative differences
The group broke up in 1995 (shortly after a Sprite TV commercial), however they have collaborated several times since on a handful of cuts from Pete Rock's solo recordings: Soul Survivor (1998), PeteStrumentals (2001) and Soul Survivor II (2004). The duo also went on a brief reunion tour as a warm up for their then-anticipated new album, which ended with a show at London's famous Jazz Cafe.  Despite these intermittent collaborations, the pair has exchanged dismissive comments toward each other in separate interviews, disavowing plans for a full-fledged reunion.

Their best-of compilation, Good Life, was released on Elektra/WEA in 2003.

During this period, CL Smooth went on to release two solo albums - American Me in 2006 and The Outsider in 2007. Pete Rock would produce tracks for numerous artists, including CL Smooth's It's a Love Thing and Love is a Battlefield from each of his solo albums. Pete Rock had confirmed that among his promised new slew of releases in 2011, that one of the albums would be the third album between himself and CL Smooth, that as of 2012, is still in the works.

2010–2018: Reunion
A deluxe CD box set of Mecca and the Soul Brother was released on September 14, 2010 by Traffic Entertainment Group. The package includes a remastered CD of the original album, a second disc of remixes, instrumentals and a cappellas, a fold-out poster and a detailed booklet with interviews and insights from Rock and Smooth by Brian Coleman.

In late 2010, the two finally ended their creative differences after 15 years of being at odds with each other. The death of hip-hop pioneer Guru earlier in the year was a major catalyst to inspire their reunion. They wanted to avoid the fate which befell Gang Starr, in which lead rapper Guru had not been on speaking terms with DJ Premier for roughly seven years and could not resolve their differences before his untimely death from cancer.

While touring in London with CL Smooth in early December 2011, Pete Rock stated that a new album was already in the works and would be released by year's end, or as soon as it was completed. The album will be the duo's third album, and the first album since 1994's The Main Ingredient. The album was still in the works as recently as 2016, but as of 2018, it has been stated that there won't be any third album by the group, due to resurfacing tensions between Rock and Smooth.

Discography

Studio albums

EPs

Movie Soundtracks
 April 1993: Who's the Man? [Original Motion Picture Soundtrack], track 3, 	"What's Next on the Menu?"
 May 1993: Menace II Society (The Original Motion Picture Soundtrack), track 10, “Death Becomes You”
 June 1993: Poetic Justice: Music from the Motion Picture, track 6, “One in a Million”

Compilations

 2003: Good Life: The Best of Pete Rock & CL Smooth

Singles

References

External links
Interview with Pete Rock
Interview with CL Smooth
Pete Rock & CL Smooth at Discogs.com

American hip hop groups
Five percenters
Pete Rock
Elektra Records artists
American musical duos
Hip hop duos
East Coast hip hop groups
Musical groups established in 1991
Musicians from Mount Vernon, New York
Musical groups from New York (state)
1991 establishments in New York (state)